Kent Conrad (born 1948) was a U.S. Senator from North Dakota from 1987 to 2013. Senator Conrad may also refer to:

Charles Magill Conrad (1804–1878), U.S. Senator from Louisiana from 1842 to 1843
Danielle Conrad (born 1977), Nebraska State Senate
George N. Conrad (1869–1937), Virginia State Senate
Silas A. Conrad (1840–1913), Ohio State Senate
William N. Conrad (1889–1968), New York State Senate

See also
Conrad Burns (1935–2016), U.S. Senator from Montana from 1989 to 2007